The United Swaziland Association (USA) was a political  party that promoted interests of the Europeans in Swaziland. USA was founded in 1963. It was led by Willie Meyer.

History 
The USA cooperated with the Swazi traditionalists but after the end of the alliance with the traditionalists, the USA began to support South African bantustan politics in Swaziland. The USA even suggest that South Africa or the United Kingdom buy out European holdings.

The only challenger of the USA was the Swaziland Independence Front (SIF). The SIF was like the United Party, the United National South West Party and the Rhodesia Party more liberal and moderate than the USA.

References

1963 establishments in Swaziland
Afrikaner nationalism
Afrikaner organizations
Banned far-right parties
Conservative parties in Africa
Defunct political parties in Eswatini
Nationalist parties in Africa
Political parties established in 1963
Political parties with year of disestablishment missing
Protestant political parties